The Bundeswehr  (raid-) commando course (German: Einzelkämpferlehrgang) is a course conducted by the German Bundeswehr.  The course was established in the early 1980s and is aimed on testing the physical and mental endurance of participants.  It teaches special skills and tactics necessary to operate and survive under stressful conditions, and Jagdkampf advanced infantry tactics.

Until recently the Einzelkämpferlehrgang was a requirement for becoming an officer in the Bundeswehr.  However, it became optional for officers and for NCOs.  The course was taught at the German paratrooper school in Altenstadt, Upper Bavaria, now only at the German infantry school in Hammelburg. It is still a requirement for officers of combat troops, while for non-combat troops it has been replaced by a dedicated survival course (German: Lehrgang infanteristischer Kompetenzerhalt).

The unarmed close quarter combat instructor part of the Advanced course has been modified into its own separate course in 2010. It now closely follows the Krav Maga curriculum. close quarter combat is still part of the basic course curriculum. 

The course is separated into two parts:

Basic course (Grundlehrgang) EKL1
 Survival-skills
 Small unit tactics 
Advanced course (Leistungslehrgang) EKL2
 Instructor certification for previously acquired skills
 Leadership and advanced infantry minor tactics.
 Guerrilla warfare fundamentals

Sample schedule for basic course

Week 1
 Arrival
 3000m track and obstacle course, classroom instruction, receiving firearms, briefing
 Relocating to training area, speedy march (with the least resting possible), training in camouflage and firearms, transporting wounded soldiers
 Classroom instruction, navigation exercise in day and night
 3000m track and obstacle course, instruction in knots
Week 2
 3000m track, obstacle course, ambushing, hand-to-hand fighting (Krav Maga since 2008)
 Rappelling, Zodiac boats, ambushing
 Rappelling, crossing rivers, hand-to-hand fighting, obstacle course
 Hand-to-hand fighting, obstacle course
Week 3 "Hungerweek" max. 1 MRE per week
 Camouflage, hand-to-hand fighting, obstacle course, night navigation exercise, setting up bivouac
 SERE exercise
 24-hour exercise including transportation of wounded soldiers
 Survival skills, hand-to-hand fighting
 Hand-to-hand fighting
Week 4
 Final exercises, 70 km march
 Debriefing, awarding of Einzelkämpfer patch by commander

Sample schedule for advanced course

Week 1
 Arrival
 Introduction, initial physical fitness test (obstacle course in less than 1:50 min, 7000m march with 20 kg backpack in less than 52min)
 Training in firearms and equipment (ropes, radios, etc.), classroom instruction
 Hand-to-hand fighting, land navigation, parachute jump
 Hand-to-hand fighting
Week 2
 Relocation to Sauwald, instruction in handling explosives, instruction in ambushing, map reading
 Rock climbing in Füssen
 Basics of commando actions
 Ambushing
 Commando exercise
 Hand-to-hand fighting

Week 3
 Rock climbing
 Briefing, relocating to training area
 Infiltration, evasion, reconnaissance, ambushing
 Evasion and escaping, extraction, debriefing
 Written test, test for hand-to-hand combat instructor
Week 4
 Written test, commando warfare, briefing
 Evasion, reconnaissance, ambush
 Evasion, using hideouts and alternative hideouts
 Debriefing
 Hand-to-hand fighting, urban warfare
Week 5
 Briefing, relocation to training area
 Establishing hideouts, reconnaissance, ambushing
 Debriefing
 Returning equipment
 Awarding of Einzelkämpfer patch, end of course

Einzelkämpferabzeichen

For the successful completion of each part of the course, the Einzelkämpferabzeichen (Lone-warrior badge) patch is awarded. 
The patch shows either one (for completion of basic course) or two (for completion of advanced course) dark green oak leaved with light green background.

Comparable courses
  Ranger school
  All Arms Commando Course

References
  (in English)
  (in German)
 (in German)

Bundeswehr
Military education and training in Germany
Commando training